David Chaladze (born 22 January 1976) is a Georgian former professional footballer who played as a striker.

Honours
 Virsliga top scorer: 1997 (25 goals)
 Russian First Division top scorer: 2002 (20 goals).

References

Living people
1976 births
Footballers from Georgia (country)
Association football forwards
Georgia (country) international footballers
Anorthosis Famagusta F.C. players
FC Rubin Kazan players
Skonto FC players
FC Spartak Vladikavkaz players
Russian Premier League players
Ukrainian Premier League players
Cypriot First Division players
Expatriate footballers from Georgia (country)
Expatriate sportspeople from Georgia (country) in Ukraine
Expatriate footballers in Ukraine
Expatriate sportspeople from Georgia (country) in Russia
Expatriate footballers in Russia
Expatriate sportspeople from Georgia (country) in Latvia
Expatriate footballers in Latvia
Expatriate footballers in Cyprus
Footballers from Tbilisi
Erovnuli Liga players